Mamadou Fofana (born 21 May 1995) is an Ivorian former footballer who played professionally in Moldova.

Career statistics

Club

Notes

References

1995 births
Living people
Sportspeople from Bamako
Ivorian footballers
Association football midfielders
Moldovan Super Liga players
FC Saxan players
CSF Bălți players
Ivorian expatriate footballers
Expatriate footballers in Moldova
Ivorian expatriate sportspeople in Moldova